Thet Win Aung (27 August 1971 – 16 October 2006) was a Burmese student activist.

He took part in the 1988 Movement as one of the leading members of his high school student union, Tamwe Township. In 1989, he was elected vice general secretary of the Basic Education Student Union (BESU). He was dismissed from his school for his political involvement in student demonstrations, later jailed for 9 months for aiding in forming the Student Union.

In 1994, the military intelligence tried to arrest him again because he published the All Burma Federation of Student Unions pamphlets and organized student demonstrations to commemorate the 32nd anniversary of 7 July Protests. Although he escaped, his home was searched frequently and his family was harassed incessantly while he was on his run. From behind the scenes, he took part in the 1996 student demonstrations and helped organized the student protests against the poor quality of education and students' rights in 1998. He was arrested in October 1998, and sentenced to 59 years in prison. At first, he was detained in Kalay Prison, Sagaing Division. He was moved to Khamti Prison, and transferred to the Mandalay Prison at 2004.

Whilst in prison, he and his fellow prisoners of conscience were subjected to inhumane torture and withheld proper medical treatment. By placing him in Mandalay Prison, he was kept as far away from his family as possible. He, therefore, received few food parcels or medical supplies (families were often burdened with having to bring supplies and medicines to prisoners as the government did not provide some basic necessities). He contracted malaria and died in Mandalay prison on 16 October 2006.

Thet Win Aung was elected Honorary Vice-President of the Reading University Students' Union after being adopted as their Amnesty International Group's prisoner.

Thet Win Aung's brother, Pyone Cho (also known as Htay Win Aung), is also an internationally recognized human rights activist and was one of the main student leaders of the 1988 Uprising. Like Thet Win Aung, Pyone Cho spent his entire adult life advocating for democracy, spending 20 years as a prisoner of conscience.

References

1971 births
2006 deaths
People from Yangon
Amnesty International prisoners of conscience held by Myanmar
Burmese people who died in prison custody
Burmese politicians
Deaths from malaria
Infectious disease deaths in Myanmar
Prisoners who died in Burmese detention